The 12467 / 12468 Leelan Superfast Express is a Express train of the Indian Railways connecting  in Rajasthan and  of Rajasthan. It is currently being operated with 12467/12468 train numbers on a daily basis.

Service

The 12467 Leelan Superfast Express has an average speed of 55 km/hr and covers 698 km in 12 hrs 40 mins. 12468 Leelan Superfast Express has an average speed of 55 km/hr and covers 698.8 km in 12 hrs 40 mins.

Route & halts

The important halts of the train are:

Coach composition

The train has standard ICF rakes with max speed of 110 kmph. The train consists of 22 coaches:

 1 AC III Tier
 1 Sleeper class
 2 Second sitting
 6 general
 2 second-class luggage/parcel van

Traction

Both trains are hauled by an Abu Road Diesel Loco Shed-based WDM-3A diesel locomotive from Jaisalmer to Jaipur Junction, and vice versa.

Now no reversal as it halts at new station of Merta Road i.e., Merta Road Bypass

Rake sharing 

The train shares its rake with 14703/14704 Jaisalmer–Lalgarh Express.

See also 

 Pune Junction railway station
 Jaipur Junction railway station
 Jaisalmer–Lalgarh Express

References

External links 
 Leelan SF Express
 12468/Leelan SF Express

Transport in Jaipur
Transport in Jaisalmer
Express trains in India
Rail transport in Rajasthan
Named passenger trains of India